José Gregorio Piña Flores (born 5 January 1996) is a Venezuelan professional footballer who plays as a midfielder.

Club career

Atlético Venezuela
On 10 August 2013, Piña made his debut in the Venezuelan Primera División for Caracas-based club Atlético Venezuela. He made a further seven appearances that season and scored a goal in a 1–3 loss to Estudiantes de Mérida on 17 November 2013.

Unión Atlético Falcón
In 2017, Piña played for Venezuelan Segunda División side Unión Atlético Falcón and scored a goal in the Copa Venezuela against Academia Puerto Cabello.

York9
On 28 April 2019, York9 FC revealed that Piña had signed with Canadian Premier League side, although the club had not made a formal announcement about his signing. After failing to appear for the team after his signing, on 27 June 2019 York9 coach Jimmy Brennan revealed that the club was continuing to sort out visa issues with Piña, which had prevented him from coming to Canada.

References

External links

1996 births
Living people
Association football midfielders
Venezuelan footballers
People from Falcón
Venezuelan expatriate footballers
Expatriate soccer players in Canada
Venezuelan expatriate sportspeople in Canada
Atlético Venezuela C.F. players
York United FC players
Venezuelan Primera División players
Venezuelan Segunda División players